Back of the Hill station is a surface stop on the light rail MBTA Green Line E branch, located in the Mission Hill neighborhood of Boston, Massachusetts. It is named after, and primarily serves, the adjacent Back of the Hill apartment complex, a Section 8 development for elderly and disabled residents. Back of the Hill is located on the street running section of the E branch on South Huntington Avenue. The station has no platforms; passengers wait in bus shelters (shared with route 39 buses) on the sidewalks and cross a traffic lane to reach Green Line trains.

History

The Boston Elevated Railway opened streetcar tracks on the newly-laid-out South Huntington Avenue between Centre Street and Huntington Avenue on May 11, 1903. The company began Jamaica Plain–Park Street service via South, Centre, South Huntington, and Huntington as a branch of existing Boston–Brookline service on Huntington Avenue. The line became part of the Metropolitan Transit Authority in 1947, and part of the Massachusetts Bay Transportation Authority (MBTA) in 1967; it was designated as the E Branch of the MBTA Green Line in 1967.

The Back of the Hill apartment complex, located just north of Heath Street, was built in 1980 and opened in 1981. The E Branch was closed for track work from June 21, 1980, to June 26, 1982; trains began stopping at Back of the Hill then or after.

Back of the Hill is the least-used stop on the MBTA subway system, averaging only 35 riders per day by a 2011 count. It was one of only four stops to average fewer than 100 riders per day. In 2021, the MBTA indicated plans to modify the Heath Street–Brigham Circle section of the E branch with accessible platforms to replace the existing non-accessible stopping locations.

References

External links

MBTA - Back of the Hill
 Station from Google Maps Street View

Green Line (MBTA) stations
Railway stations in Boston
Railway stations in the United States opened in 1982